Zieria rimulosa  is a plant in the citrus family Rutaceae and is endemic to north Queensland. It is a shrub with leaves composed of three leaflets, and with white flowers with four petals and four stamens. Unlike many other zierias, its leaves are neither rough, glandular or densely hairy.

Description
The leaves are bright green and both surfaces of the leaves are mostly glabrous apart from a few hairs on the lower surface. The edges of the leaflets often have small warts and are turned slightly downwards. The flowers are white to pale pink and are arranged in groups of up to fifty flowers in leaf axils, each flower  in diameter, the groups much longer than the leaves. The fruits are glabrous and dotted with glands. Flowers and fruits have been observed in April.

Taxonomy and naming
Zieria rimulosa was first formally described in 1942 by Cyril Tenison White in Proceedings of the Royal Society of Queensland from a specimen collected on Mount Mulligan. The specific epithet (rimulosa) is a Latin word meaning "full of little fissures or cracks".

Distribution and habitat
This zieria is only known from Mount Mulligan and the Mount Carbine Tableland where it grows in woodland on rocky pavements and cliffs.

Conservation
Zieria rimulosa is listed as "Vulnerable" under the Commonwealth Government Environment Protection and Biodiversity Conservation Act 1999 (EPBC) Act. The main threat to the species is its limited distribution.

References

rimulosa
Sapindales of Australia
Flora of Queensland
Plants described in 1942